Sir Stephen Wilson Furness, 1st Baronet (26 May 1872 – 6 September 1914) was a British shipping magnate and a Liberal Party politician.

A member of a prominent ship-owning family from West Hartlepool, Furness was educated at Ashville College, Harrogate. He was a member of West Hartlepool Town Council in 1897 and of Durham County Council in 1898. He was a Justice of the Peace, and a member of the Hartlepool Port and Harbour Commission.

He was elected as Member of Parliament (MP) for The Hartlepools at a by-election in June 1910, after the re-election in January 1910 of his uncle Sir Christopher was voided as a result of an electoral petition. When his uncle Christopher died in 1912, he succeeded him as Furness, Withy and Company, and also became chairman of over a dozen other companies and director of more. He was made a baronet on 18 June 1913, of Tunstall Grange, in the borough of West Hartlepool, in the County of Durham, and held his seat in the House of Commons until his death in 1914, aged 42, in an accident while on holiday.

Personal life 

In 1899 he married Eleanor Forster, with whom he had three sons and one daughter. They lived at Tunstall Grange, in West Hartlepool.

References

External links 
 

1872 births
1914 deaths
Liberal Party (UK) MPs for English constituencies
UK MPs 1910
UK MPs 1910–1918
Baronets in the Baronetage of the United Kingdom
Councillors in North East England
British businesspeople in shipping
People educated at Ashville College
19th-century British businesspeople
Accidental deaths